Květa Hrdličková won in the final 6–3, 6–1 against Fang Li.

Seeds
A champion seed is indicated in bold text while text in italics indicates the round in which that seed was eliminated.

  Fang Li (final)
  Mirjana Lučić (second round)
  Sandra Kleinová (first round)
  Gala León García (semifinals)
  Cristina Torrens Valero (second round)
  Nathalie Dechy (second round)
 n/a
  Elena Wagner (first round)
  Lenka Němečková (semifinals)

Draw

External links
 1998 Makarska International Championships Draw

Makarska International Championships
1998 WTA Tour